The Legislative Sejm of the Second Polish Republic was the first national parliament (Sejm) of the newly independent Second Polish Republic. It was elected in the 1919 Polish legislative election.

Background
The Legislative Sejm was formed in the aftermath of World War I on the territories of the newly independent Second Polish Republic. In late 1918 Polish state was governed by Józef Piłsudski, who quickly begun the work to organize election to the first Polish national parliament (Sejm) since the Grodno Sejm of 1793, held two years before partitions of Poland ended the independent existence of the Polish–Lithuanian Commonwealth.

History
The elections to the Sejm took place on January 26, 1919. At that time, Poland did not have fixed boundaries, and was involved in territorial conflicts and disputes. On the territories under the nascent Polish state's control, in the lands of former Congress Kingdom and Podlasie region, and western Lesser Poland, 42 electoral districts returned 302 deputies. In addition, 20 Polish deputies to the German Parliament, 26 Polish deputies to the Austro-Hungarian Parliament, and selected candidates from the Cieszyn region (where elections were disrupted due to hostilities) were added to the Sejm. In the coming months, as the Polish control grew over some disputed territories, more elections were held: on April 25, 1919, in Greater Poland and on June 15, 1919 in the Białystok and Podlasie regions. Some deputies who were provisional representatives yielded their seats to the newly elected ones. On March 24, 1922, the Sejm was joined by 20 deputies from the Republic of Central Lithuania (the dissolved Sejm of Central Lithuania). The Sejm thus had a changing number of deputies, starting at 348 and ending its term with 432 members. About 5 million votes were cast in the election.

Important legislation passed by the Sejm included laws on the military draft, land reform, and the development of a constitution, and the state-sponsored health insurance system. In 1921 the Sejm passed the March Constitution.

Composition 
Due to the changing number of deputies, and the ongoing fragmentation and merger of various parties, there is a number of different composition listings for the Legislative Sejm.

The composition of the Legislative Sejm was as follows:

Marshal of the Sejm was Wojciech Trąmpczyński.

In July 1922

Notes
a.  Neither Nohlen and Stöver nor Jędruch did retain original for Polish parties and groups; they used their own translations. As such, identification with a particular entity was not always possible.

References

See also
 Small Constitution (1919)

1919 establishments in Poland
1939 disestablishments in Poland
Sejm
Second Polish Republic